Nord was a free 3D MMORPG that was playable online and on Facebook by SLX games, which became Skygoblin after their merger with the developer of The Journey Down.  Nord was the first virtual world on Facebook that was presented in full 3D.

Release
Nord was originally released online on April 8, 2009. On September 22, 2010, the game was adapted to be played on Facebook.
Nord is however running down operations starting in September in preparation for final closure set for December 29, 2013.

References

External links 
 Nord website
 Nord website at Skygoblin

2009 video games
Facebook games
Freeware games
Massively multiplayer online role-playing games
Video games developed in Sweden